Jason McEndoo (born February 25, 1975) is an American football coach and former center in the National Football League for the Seattle Seahawks. He is currently the tight ends and Cowboy Backs coach for Oklahoma State. He played college football at Washington State University in Pullman and was a member of the 1997 team which went to the Rose Bowl. 

Born in San Diego, California, McEndoo played high school football in southwest Washington at  Aberdeen. Selected in the seventh round of the 1998 NFL Draft, McEndoo played one game for Seattle in his rookie season in 1998; he was released the following summer on September 5, 1999.

Married for less than a month in 1996, McEndoo and his wife Michelle were passengers in a rollover accident in which she was killed. The vehicle was driven by teammate Ryan McShane, who apparently fell asleep. The three were returning to Pullman after attending a teammate's wedding in Tacoma, and occurred on Interstate 90, near Ellensburg.

References

External links
 

1975 births
Living people
Players of American football from San Diego
American football centers
Washington State Cougars football players
Seattle Seahawks players
Coaches of American football from California
High school football coaches in Washington (state)
Montana State Bobcats football coaches
Oklahoma State Cowboys football coaches